Monday Night Special was a Canadian free-format television series which aired on CBC Television in 1961.

Premise
Different types of programmes were aired each week under the Monday Night Special banner such as dancing, dramas, documentaries and journalistic features. The programming was produced from various sources including the BBC, the National Film Board of Canada and the CBC itself.

The debut episode was a documentary on Upper Canada Village that was previously broadcast on Camera Canada. The BBC productions included the Peter Ustinov interview feature After Supper and a play by Friedrich Schiller. From the Comparisons series came the National Film Board of Canada productions Courtship and Marriage and Of Sport And Men. CBC productions included the Vancouver documentaries Goom Sahm (a Portrait of a Chinese Community) and Man Against Nature, plus an adaptation of the play The Long Night by Joseph Schull and an extended 90-minute episode of A Case for the Court. Other productions included features on Newfoundland and the Banff School of Fine Arts. Ballet performances from the Royal Winnipeg Ballet and The Royal Ballet (UK) were the subject of other episodes.

Scheduling
This hour-long series aired on Mondays at 10:00 p.m. from 26 June to 25 September 1961.

References

External links
 

CBC Television original programming
1961 Canadian television series debuts
1961 Canadian television series endings